C.S.D. Galcasa was a Guatemalan football club, which won the Copa de Guatemala in 1980, and were Liga Nacional de Fútbol de Guatemala runners-up in 1986.

References

Defunct football clubs in Guatemala